is a Japanese rock band that was formed in 2013 by Japanese singer-songwriter Yui. The group debuted with the single "Tsuki" (2013).

Biography 

Vocalist Yui is a musician from Fukuoka, who originally debuted as a soloist under Sony Music Entertainment Japan in 2005, after auditioning in 2004. She released five studio albums between 2006 and 2011, all of which were commercially successful. Some of her most famous songs include "Good-bye Days" (2006), the theme song for the film Midnight Sun which starred her as Xeroderma Pigmentosum sufferer Kaoru Amane, and the spring song "Cherry" (2007), both of which were certified million by the RIAJ. In November 2012, Yui announced her intention to retire from music as a soloist.

Flower Flower was first formed in early 2013, composed of musicians Yui respected. These included keyboardist Mura☆Jun, otherwise known as Jun Murayama, a member of the band Venomstrip and a session musician, as well as Mafumafu, i.e. bassist Katsuhiro Mafune, and drummer Norihide Saji, known in the band as Sacchan.

The band started with recording sessions, followed by a series of secret lives across Japan in March 2013. The project was officially announced in April 2013, followed by a series of festival performances. The group released their first single "Tsuki" digitally in June, used in a commercial campaign for cellphone provider au. The group attended festivals such as Join Alive, Rock in Japan Festival and Countdown Japan.

In May 2014, the band released their second song, "Kamisama". In June, it was announced that Flower Flower would perform the four theme songs for the live-action adaptation of Daisuke Igarashi's manga Little Forest, released in two parts in August 2014 and February 2015. Flower Flower performed the theme songs for each season, with summer and autumn released in 2014 and winter and spring in 2015.

The name Flower Flower was picked as Yui wanted something natural in their band name.

Discography

Studio album

Extended play

Singles

Video albums

Music videos

Notes

References

External links 

 
Sony Music label site
Official blog

2013 establishments in Japan
Japanese rock music groups
Sony Music Entertainment Japan artists
Musical groups established in 2013
Musical groups from Tokyo
Musical quartets